"He's Got You" is a song written by Ronnie Dunn and Terry McBride, and recorded by American country music duo Brooks & Dunn. It was released in October 1997 as the second and final single from their compilation album The Greatest Hits Collection.  The song peaked at number 2 on the US Country chart for two weeks, only behind "Just to See You Smile" by Tim McGraw.

Music video
The music video was directed by Steven Goldmann and premiered in December 1997. It shows the duo performing the song, intersect with a thunderstorm rolling into the sky.

Chart positions
"He's Got You" debuted at number 70 on the U.S. Billboard Hot Country Songs chart for the week of October 18, 1997.

Year-end charts

References

1997 singles
1997 songs
Brooks & Dunn songs
Songs written by Terry McBride (musician)
Music videos directed by Steven Goldmann
Songs written by Ronnie Dunn
Song recordings produced by Don Cook
Arista Nashville singles